The Orca Welfare and Safety Act is a bill passed in the U.S. state of California in 2016. The bill phases out the holding of killer whales in captivity and establishes standards for treatment of all remaining captive orcas in zoos.

The bill has been interpreted as being particularly targeted at the wildlife parks chains that hold Marine mammals such as SeaWorld and a response to the film Blackfish. Since the beginning of Orca captivity in 1961 there have been 156 Orcas held in captivity. As of March 2017, there are 61 Orcas held in captivity around the world and SeaWorld owns 26 of them.

Legislative Process 
In 2014 California Assembly member Richard Bloom introduced the assembly bill 2140 known as the Orca Welfare and Safety Act. In April 2014 there was a live hearing in the Committee of Water, Parks, and Wildlife where there was no initial decision and the bill was set aside for an interim study. The bill sat for two years until March 2016 when it was reintroduced as AB 2305 and put to a vote. In April the bill passed the California Assembly with no opposition and moved onto the senate renamed as AB 1453. After the bill passed the senate, the Governor of California, Jerry Brown, signed the Orca Welfare and Safety Act in September 2016 and the bill went into effect January 2017.

Bill 
This law makes it illegal for any person, institute, or corporation to breed captive Orcas, illegal to move or receive captive Orcas or Orca embryos from a captive orca from any state or country, and illegal to use captive orcas as a mean of entertainment/performance.  A violation of this law from any person, institute, or corporation is a $100,000 fine and/or 6 months in jail as a misdemeanor. The law also establishes that the remaining captive Orcas in California are to be used for educational purposes and will exhibit natural behavior with a live science-based narration to the public.

Response 

In 2014 with the introduction of AB 2140 SeaWorld responded by releasing plans of a new expansion to the Orca enclosure in San Diego called "Blue World". This was a $100 million expansion that would give the guests a more natural Orca experience. In 2015 the California Coastal Commission approved SeaWorld's coastal development permit Application 6-15-0424, but they added a ban on breeding and the import and export of the Orcas. SeaWorld did not agree with the decision and sued the California Coastal Commission claiming they did not have the authority to ban orca breeding in captivity. In April 2016 after the bill passed the California Assembly, SeaWorld withdrew their expansion plans of "Blue World" and released a statement saying they would use the $100 million for other exhibits and attractions in the park.

SeaWorld San Diego then announced that they would end the theatrical Orca shows, which the last show was in January 2017, and would transition to a new "Orca Encounter Exhibit". The company claims it will make the encounter more realistic to their natural setting and will aim towards research, education, care, and respect for the Orcas.

References 

2016 in California
2016 in American law
Animals and humans
California statutes
Orcas
SeaWorld Parks & Entertainment